Schrankia kogii is a species of moth of the family Erebidae first described by Hiroshi Inoue in 1979. It is found in Japan.

The length of the forewings is 6–9 mm.

References

Moths described in 1979
Moths of Japan
Hypenodinae